Wendy Nelson may refer to: 

 Wendy Nelson (politician), South African politician
 Wendy Nelson (marine scientist), New Zealand botanist and phycologist
 Wendy Watson Nelson, Canadian-American marriage and family therapist